The Orinoco softtail (Thripophaga cherriei) is a species of bird in the family Furnariidae.
It is endemic to the state of Amazonas in southwestern Venezuela. It has not yet been confirmed as occurring away from the type locality along the Río Capuana, a tributary of the Río Orinoco.

Its natural habitat is riparian tropical moist lowland forest, specifically várzea forest approximately 100 meters in elevation. It is threatened by habitat loss.

References

External links
BirdLife Species Factsheet.

Orinoco softtail
Birds of the Venezuelan Amazon
Endemic birds of Venezuela
Orinoco softtail
Taxonomy articles created by Polbot